The Bauana River is a river of Amazonas, Brazil. It is a tributary of the Tefé River.

The river forms the northern boundary of the Tefé National Forest, created in 1989.

See also
List of rivers of Amazonas (Brazilian state)

References

Rivers of Amazonas (Brazilian state)